The Hyde County Courthouse is located at 412 Commercial Street SE in Highmore, the county seat of Hyde County, South Dakota.  It is a rectangular masonry structure, two stories in height, set on a high basement.  The foundation is sandstone, while the main walls are Indiana limestone.  The center portion of the front and rear facades project slightly, framed by pilasters.  The front facade has a portico supported by four columns, two square and two unfluted Doric round columns.  The building was designed by the Black Hills Company of Deadwood and built in 1911.  It has served since then as the county courthouse, and is the county's most prominent example of Classical Revival architecture.

The building was listed on the National Register of Historic Places in 1978.

See also
National Register of Historic Places listings in Hyde County, South Dakota

References

Courthouses on the National Register of Historic Places in South Dakota
Neoclassical architecture in South Dakota
Government buildings completed in 1911
Buildings and structures in Hyde County, South Dakota
County courthouses in South Dakota
National Register of Historic Places in Hyde County, South Dakota
1911 establishments in South Dakota